Catrine Bengtsson (born 21 September 1969) is a retired female badminton player from Sweden.

Career
Bengtsson competed in badminton at the 1992 Summer Olympics in women's singles and women's doubles with Maria Bengtsson, and they lost in quarterfinals to Guan Weizhen and Nong Qunhua, of China, 15-4, 15-9. She also competed in the 1996 Summer Olympics in the three events: women's singles, women's doubles with Margit Borg and mixed doubles with Peter Axelsson.

In 1994, she won the European Badminton Championships in mixed doubles with Denmark's Michael Søgaard. In 1993 she claimed her biggest title, the IBF World Championship in mixed doubles with Denmark's Thomas Lund.

References

External links
 
 
 
 

Swedish female badminton players
Badminton players at the 1992 Summer Olympics
Badminton players at the 1996 Summer Olympics
Olympic badminton players of Sweden
Living people
1969 births
Sportspeople from Gothenburg
20th-century Swedish women